Vera Lopes (born 1 April 1982) is a former Portuguese handball player who was member of the Portugal women's national handball team.

International career

She competed at the 2008 European Women's Handball Championship that was held in the Republic of Macedonia from 2–14 December, where the Portuguese team qualified in 16th place.

Achievements

1ª Divisão de Andebol Feminino:
Winner: 2010, 2011

Individual awards

 Best Player 1ª Divisão de Andebol Feminino: 2010/2011

References

1982 births
Living people
Portuguese female handball players
Expatriate handball players
Portuguese expatriate sportspeople in Spain
Portuguese expatriate sportspeople in Iceland